"In Love with Myself" is a house song performed by French DJ David Guetta, featuring vocals from singer JD Davis, released as the fourth and final single from Guetta's second studio album, Guetta Blaster on 18 March 2005. The single was only released in France, however, charted elsewhere due to strong downloads. No music video exists for the track.

Track listing
 French CD single
 "In Love with Myself" (Benny Benassi Remix) – 6:34
 "In Love with Myself" (Fuzzy Hair Remix) – 8:02
 "In Love with Myself" (Robbie Rivera Remix) – 8:36
 "In Love with Myself" (David Guetta & Joachim Garraud Remix) – 7:47
 "In Love with Myself" (JD Davis Remix) – 5:37

Charts

Weekly charts

Year-end charts

Notes

2005 singles
David Guetta songs
Songs written by David Guetta
Songs written by Joachim Garraud
2004 songs
Perfecto Records singles
Song recordings produced by David Guetta